An Indonesian passport is a travel document issued by the Government of Indonesia to Indonesian citizens residing in Indonesia or overseas. The main governing body with regards to the issuance of such passport(s), possession(s), withdrawal and related matters is the Directorate General of Immigration under the Ministry of Law and Human Rights. Indonesia does not recognize multiple citizenship for its citizens and such citizens will automatically lose their Indonesian citizenship if another citizenship is acquired voluntarily. Special exceptions allow newly born citizens to hold dual nationalities (including Indonesian) until his/her eighteenth birthday after which a choice of either nationalities should be decided. The latest Indonesian passport has different national birds and sceneries on each page.

The latest version of Indonesian passport was first announced on 30 October 2014. Visible revisions include:
 Cover colour: Prior to 30 October 2014, ordinary Indonesian passports were issued with a dark green cover while the latest one is turquoise green.
 Coat of arms: The coat of arms is now centered and significantly larger than older editions
 Translation (cover only): Only 'passport' appears bilingually (Indonesian above and English below) while the phrase 'Republik Indonesia' is not translated to 'Republic of Indonesia'.

Types

Ordinary passports

According to Government Regulation No. 31/2013, ordinary passports consists of electronic and non-electronic versions.

Electronic passport 

Effective from 26 January 2011, the Directorate General of Immigration introduced ordinary electronic passports (e-passport) for Indonesian citizens. The initial launch quota was set at 10,000 copies for the year 2011. Biometric passports were initially available only in three immigration offices: West Jakarta, Soekarno–Hatta, and Central Jakarta. Availability has then widened, with ordinary electronic passports being issued in all immigration offices in Jakarta, Surabaya, and Batam. The electronic passports are available in 24 and 48 page versions (like non-biometric passports). The biometric chips are embedded within the back cover of the passports.

In 2011, approximately 12,000 Indonesian citizens obtained biometric passports and starting from the January 25, 2012, the Indonesian Immigration Authority launched computerized immigration gates at Soekarno–Hatta International Airport, reducing queue time for biometric passport holders as they no longer need to check in manually at the immigration counter. The service is available for both arriving and departing passengers. The government plans to install computerized gates in airports throughout the country.

As per second quarter of 2015, the electronic ordinary Indonesian passport is also issued in the latest version that is covered with turquoise green color.

Indonesian e-passport holders can enjoy visa-free travel to Japan for up to 15 days per stay (albeit still requiring a visa waiver endorsement certificate to be issued at Japanese embassy prior to travel). Non-electronic passport holders do not enjoy this privilege and must have a visa whenever they want to travel to Japan.

Visa-free privileges of other countries for Indonesian passport holders are currently valid for both passport types.

Diplomatic passports

Issued by the Ministry of Foreign Affairs for Indonesian subject(s) who is serving as diplomat and/or government person in order to travel for diplomatic purpose(s). Such passport also covers the immediate family that would travel along with the main passport holder. Holding an Indonesian diplomatic passport does not guarantee a 'diplomatic immunity' to its bearer  although those who gain 'diplomatic immunity' might be holding such passport. Holding such passport does not also entitle the bearer to travel with the passport for non-diplomatic mission. Appropriate 'non-diplomatic' visa or entry clearance should be obtained prior to travel to the destined country. The latest version of the Indonesian diplomatic passport is issued in a black colored-cover.

Service passports

Issued by Ministry of Foreign Affairs for Indonesian subject(s) who is serving as civil servant on official travel. This type of passport is also issued to the immediate family member of the main passport bearer. The latest version of the service passport is issued in a blue colored-cover.

Hajj passports (obsolete)

The Ministry of Religious Affairs formerly issued hajj passports for the hajj pilgrimage to Mecca under Article 29(1)(d) and Article 33 of the Immigration Act of 1992. However, new government regulations in 2009 deleted the relevant portions of the legislation. As of Hajj 2009, all hajj pilgrims from Indonesia use ordinary passports. The use of ordinary passports is a requirement of the Saudi Arabian government.

Passport Note

The passports contain a note from the issuing state that is addressed to the authorities of all other states, identifying the bearer as a citizen of that state and requesting that he or she be allowed to pass and be treated according to international norms. The note is found on the first page of the passport, which is on the other side of the identity page.
The note inside the latest version of Indonesian passports states:
In Indonesian:   
In English:  The Government of the Republic of Indonesia requests to all whom it may concern to allow the bearer to pass freely without let or hindrance and afford him/her such assistance and protection. This passport is valid for all countries and areas unless otherwise endorsed The English translation only makes sense if the phrase 'as may be necessary' follows 'protection' at the end of the sentence.

In case of diplomatic and service passports, those are not formally valid for visits to Israel and Taiwan, since there are no formal diplomatic ties with those countries, requiring diplomats and servicemens to use ordinary passports and to obtain appropriate visa or entry clearance from the immigration authority of the destined countries.

There is slight difference as appears on page number three, which is immediately next to the identity page, between the ordinary non-electronic passport and the electronic version. The ordinary non-electronic passport depicts signatures of both the bearer of the passport and the issuing authority, both are manually done at the immigration office during the interview by the immigration officer. Official later stamp of the corresponding issuing authority logo on the same page with the signatures.

The ordinary electronic passport no longer bears the signature or of the issuing authority as such information has been embedded in the digital information system. However, the signature of the bearer is still manually done during the interview by the immigration officer although digital signature of the holder is also included in the digital information embedded on the electronic chip along with the ten-fingerprints and digital face photograph. Above the signature, reminder of the inclusion of the chip on the passport can be found requesting appropriate treatment of the passport to avoid chip disturbance as such passport should not be bent and/or exposed to extreme radioactivity devices.

Third page of the latest (2014) version of Indonesian ordinary passport (both electronic and non-electronic versions) contains 'warning' that would typically be printed on the interior side of the back cover of its predecessor version.

Identity information page

Photograph
Type (
Country code (
Passport number
Sex
Nationality
Date of birth
Place of birth
Date of issue
Date of expiry
Issuing office
Registration number 
Machine readable zone

Visa requirements map

Passport power ranking
As of April 2022, due to COVID-19 pandemic, Indonesian citizens have visa-free or visa on arrival access to 43 countries and territories, ranking the Indonesian passport 54th in terms of travel freedom according to The Passport Index.

Passport fees

Refer to Government Regulation No. 45/2014, Indonesian passport fees (inclusive of service charges) are:

Payment can be made through banks and ATMs (Bank Mandiri, BNI, BRI, BTN, Bank DKI, and BCA), online marketplace (Tokopedia and Bukalapak) or by cash.

Recent changes
On 19 August 2021, Ministry of Foreign Affairs launches new version of diplomatic and service e-passports, which complies with Document 9303 ICAO standard.

On 12 October 2022, the Directorate General of Immigration announced that starting from this date, a 10 year passport is now available for Indonesian citizens aged 17 or above.

See also
 Paspor Orang Asing
 Surat Perjalanan Laksana Paspor
 List of passports
 Visa requirements for Indonesian citizens
 Visa policy of Indonesia

References

External links

 Directorate General of Immigration of the Republic of Indonesia (English) 
 Indonesian Paspor Online Service

Passports by country
Law of Indonesia
Foreign relations of Indonesia